Arnaud or Arnault is the French form of the German given name Arnold.  

It derives from the Germanic roots, arn (eagle), and wald (power).

List of people called Arnaud
 Arnaud-Michel d'Abbadie (1815–1893), a French geographer
 Arnaud Amalric (died 1225), a Cistercian monk involved with the Inquisition
 Arnaud Amanieu, Lord of Albret (1338–1401), a French nobleman and Lord of Albret
 Arnaud Anastassowa (born 1988), a French-Bulgarian footballer
 Arnaud Assoumani (born 1985), a French long jumper
 Arnaud Aubert (died 1371), a French archbishop
 Arnaud Baille/Sicre (c. 1250–c. 1350), a French cobbler and informer for the Inquisition
 Arnaud Balijon (born 1983), a French football player
 Arnaud Beltrame (1973 - 2018), a French Gendarme, murdered after swapping himself for hostages in Trèbes market siege
 Arnaud Berquin (1747–1791), a French author
 Arnaud Bertheux (born 1977), a French football player
 Arnaud Blin (born 1963), a French historian and political scientist
 Arnaud Boetsch (born 1969), a French tennis player
 Arnaud Boiteau (born 1973), a French equestrian
 Arnaud Brocard (born 1986), a French football player
 Arnaud Bühler (born 1985), a Swiss football player
 Arnaud Cartwright Marts (1888–1970), a president of Bucknell University
 Arnaud Casquette (born 1978), a Mauritian long jumper
 Arnaud Chaffanjon, a French genealogist
 Arnaud Clément (born 1977), a French professional tennis player
 Arnaud Costes (born 1973), a French rugby player
 Arnaud Cotture (born 1995), a Swiss basketball player
 Arnaud Démare (born 1991), a French racing cyclist
 Arnaud Denjoy (1884–1974), a French mathematician
 Arnaud Desjardins (born 1925), a French author and producer
 Arnaud Desplechin (born 1960), a French film director
 Arnaud Dos Santos (born 1945), a French former footballer and coach
 Arnaud Di Pasquale (born 1979), a French former tennis player
 Arnaud Gérard (born 1984), a French road bicycle racer
 Arnaud Geyre (born 1935), a French former racing cyclist
 Arnaud Hybois (born 1982), a French sprint canoer
 Arnaud II de La Porte (1737–1792), a French statesman and government minister
 Arnaud I de La Porte (1706–1770), a French statesman
 Arnaud Kalimuendo (born 2002), a French football player
 Arnaud Kouyo (born 1984), an Ivoirian football player
 Arnaud Labbe (born 1976), a French racing cyclist
 Arnaud Lagardère (born 1961), the CEO of Lagardère Group
 Arnaud Larrieu (born 1966), a French film director and writer
 Arnaud Le Lan (born 1978), a French football player
 Arnaud Lebrun (born 1973), a French football player
 Arnaud Lescure (born 1986), a French football player
 Arnaud Lisembart (born 1984), a French football player
 Arnaud Maggs (1926-2012), a Canadian artist and photographer
 Arnaud Maire (born 1979), a French football player
 Arnaud Malherbe (born 1972), a South African sprinter
 Arnaud Margueritte (born 1973), a French football player
 Arnaud Massy (1877–1950), a French professional golfer
 Arnaud Merklé (born 1998), a French badminton player
 Arnaud Merlin (born 1963), a French jazz critic, music journalist and radio producer
 Arnaud Monney (born 1981), an Ivorian football player
 Arnaud Nordin (born 1998), a French football player
 Arnaud Tsamere (born 1975), a French comedian, actor and television presenter
 Arnaud Courlet de Vregille (born 1958), a French painter

French masculine given names